Batawalage Yashoda Avanthika Mendis (born 15 September 1986), known as Yashoda Mendis is a Sri Lankan cricketer. She was the leading run-scorer for Sri Lanka in the 2018 Women's Twenty20 Asia Cup, with 130 runs in five matches.

In October 2018, she was named in Sri Lanka's squad for the 2018 ICC Women's World Twenty20 tournament in the West Indies.

References

1986 births
Living people
Sri Lankan women cricketers
Sri Lanka women One Day International cricketers
Sri Lanka women Twenty20 International cricketers
People from Southern Province, Sri Lanka
Asian Games medalists in cricket
Cricketers at the 2014 Asian Games
Asian Games bronze medalists for Sri Lanka
Medalists at the 2014 Asian Games